Ausieniškės Manor is a former residential manor in Ausieniškės village in the municipality of Elektrėnai, Lithuania.

References

External links
Ausieniškės Manor photos 

Manor houses in Lithuania